Anatolian beyliks (Ottoman Turkish: Tavâif-i mülûk, Beylik ) were small principalities (or petty kingdoms) in Anatolia governed by beys, the first of which were founded at the end of the 11th century. A second more extensive period of foundations took place as a result of the decline of the Seljuq Sultanate of Rûm in the second half of the 13th century.

One of the beyliks, that of the Osmanoğlu from the Kayi tribe of the Oghuz Turks, from its capital in Bursa completed its conquest of other beyliks by the late 15th century, becoming the Ottoman Empire.

The word "beylik" denotes a territory under the jurisdiction of a bey, equivalent in other European societies to a lord.

History 

Following the 1071 Seljuq victory over the Byzantine Empire at the Battle of Manzikert and the subsequent conquest of Anatolia, Oghuz clans began settling in present-day Turkey. The Seljuq Sultanate's central power established in Konya was largely the result of using these clans under Beys called uç bey or uj begi especially in border areas to ensure safety against the Byzantines; uç is a Turkish term for a border territory equivalent to marches, thus uç beyi is similar to margrave in Europe. These clans, led by beys, would receive military and financial aid from the Seljuqs in return for their services and full allegiance.

Seljuq power deteriorated with the Mongol invasions from the east. The Ilkhanate commanders in Anatolia then gained strength and authority and this encouraged the beys to declare sovereignty. With the fall of Seljuq centralized power in Konya, many beys joined forces with the atabegs (former Seljuq leaders) and other religious Muslim leaders and warriors from Persia and Turkistan which were fleeing the Mongols that were invading the Byzantine empire. To maintain control of their new territory, these reestablished beys employed Ghazi warriors from Persia and Turkestan, who also fled the Mongols. The ghazis fought under the inspiration of either a mullah or a general, trying to assert Islamic power, their assaults of the reestablished beys upon the Byzantine Empire reaching even further expanded the power sphere of the beyliks.

As the Byzantine empire weakened, their cities in Asia Minor could resist the assaults of the beyliks less and less, and many Turks gradually settled in the western parts of Anatolia. As a result, many more beyliks were founded in these newly conquered western regions who entered into power struggles with the Byzantines, the Genoese, the Knights Templar as well as between each other.

By 1300, Turks had reached the Aegean coastline, held momentarily two centuries before. In the beginning, the most powerful states were the Karamanids and the Germiyanids in the central area. The Beylik of Osmanoğlu Dynasty who were later to found the Ottoman Empire was situated to the northwest, around Söğüt, and was a small and at that stage, insignificant power. Along the Aegean coast, from north to south, stretched Karasids, Sarukhanids, Aydinids, Menteşe and Teke principalities. The Jandarids (later called Isfendiyarids) controlled the Black Sea region around Kastamonu and Sinop.

Under its eponymous founder, Osman I, the Beylik of Osmanoğlu expanded at Byzantine expense south and west of the Sea of Marmara in the first decades of the 14th century. With their annexation of the neighboring Beylik of Karasi and their advance into Roumelia as of 1354, they soon became strong enough to emerge as the main rivals of Karamanids, who at that time were thought to be the strongest. Towards the end of the 14th century, the Ottomans advanced further into Anatolia by acquiring towns, either by buying them off or through marriage alliances. Meanwhile, the Karamanids assaulted the Ottomans many times with the help of other beyliks, Mamluks, Aq Qoyunlu ("White Sheep Turkomans"), Byzantines, Pontics and Hungarians, failing and losing power every time. By the close of the century, the early Ottoman leaders had conquered large parts of land from Karamanids and other less prominent beyliks. These had a short respite when their territories were restored to them after the Ottoman defeat suffered against Tamerlane in 1402 in the Battle of Ankara.

But the Ottoman state quickly collected itself under Mehmed I and his son Murad II, who re-incorporated most of these beyliks into Ottoman territory in a period of about 25 years. The final blow for the Karamanids was struck by Mehmed II who conquered their lands and re-assured a homogeneous rule in Anatolia. The further steps towards a single rule by the Ottomans were taken by Selim I who conquered territories of Ramadanids and Dulkadirids in 1515 during his campaign against the Mamluks, and his son Süleyman the Magnificent who more or less completely united the present territories of Turkey (and much more) in his 1534 campaign. Many of the former Anatolian beyliks became the basis for administrative subdivisions in the Ottoman Empire.

List of beyliks

Beyliks founded after Manzikert (1071) 
In the list below, only the beyliks that were founded immediately after the Battle of Manzikert in 1071, mostly situated towards the Eastern Anatolia, and who were vassals (or sometimes at war) to the centralized power of Seljuq Sultanate of Rûm based in Konya are listed.

Beyliks founded after Köse Dağ (1243) 
A second group beyliks that emerged as a result of the weakening of this central state under the Mongol blow with the Battle of Köse Dağ in 1243 which had the indirect consequence of extending the Turkic territory in Western Anatolia toward the end of the 13th century.

Society

Language
Combined with the Seljuqs and the immigration of Turkic tribes into the Anatolian mainland, the Anatolian Beyliks spread Turkic language and Islamic culture in Anatolia.
Unlike the Seljuqs, whose language of administration was Persian, the Anatolian beyliks adopted spoken Turkic as their formal literary language. 
The Turkish language achieved widespread use in these principalities and reached its highest sophistication during the Ottoman era.

Art 

In spite of their limited sources and the political climate of their era, art during the Anatolian beyliks flourished, probably building the basis for Ottoman art. Although the artistic style of the Anatolian beyliks can be considered as representatives of a transition period between Seljuks and Ottomans, new trends were also acquired. Especially wandering traditional crafts artists and architects helped spread these new trends and localized styles to several beyliks across Anatolia, which resulted in innovative and original works particularly in architecture. Wood and stone carving, clay tiles and other similar decorative arts of the Seljuqs were still used, however with the influence of the pursuit for new spaces and its reflections in other arts as well.

Some representative examples of the Anatolian beyliks' architecture are İlyas Bey Mosque at Balat (Milet) (1404), İsabey Mosque at Selçuk (1375), Ulucami Mosque at Birgi (1312) built by the Aydın beylik. The above mosques, although being successors of Seljuq architecture, differ greatly in the increase of decorations in the interior and exterior spaces and the different placement of the courtyards and minarets. Karaman beylik also left noteworthy architectural works, such as Ulucami Mosque in Ermenek (1302), Hatuniye Madrassa in Karaman (1382), Akmedrese Madrassa in Niğde (1409), all of which respect a new style that considers and incorporates the exterior surroundings also. One of the first examples of the Anatolian beylik architecture hinting at the forming of the Ottoman architecture that aims at uniting the interior space beneath one big dome and forming a monumental architectural structure is Ulucami Mosque in Manisa (1374) built by the Saruhan beylik. Also worth noting is the increase in constructions of madrassas that points at the beyliks' attaching greater importance to sciences.

Architecture
Ulucami Mosque in Ermenek (1302)
Ulucami Mosque in Manisa (1374)
İsabey Mosque at Selçuk (1375)
Hatuniye Madrassa in Karaman (1382)
İlyas Mosque at Balat (Milet) (1404)
Akmedrese Madrassa in Niğde (1409)

See also 

 History of Turkey
 List of Turkic dynasties and countries
 Sultanate of Rum
 Taifa

References

Sources 

  (limited preview)
 Westermann Großer Atlas zur Weltgeschichte

External links 

 

 
Turkic dynasties
States in medieval Anatolia
14th century in the Ottoman Empire
15th century in the Ottoman Empire